Magel Bel Abbès is a town and commune in the Kasserine Governorate, Tunisia. As of 2004 it had a population of 5003.

See also
List of cities in Tunisia

References

Populated places in Kasserine Governorate
Communes of Tunisia
Tunisia geography articles needing translation from French Wikipedia